"Final Distance" is a song by Japanese recording artist Hikaru Utada for their third studio album Deep River (2002). Written by Utada themself, the song was produced and composed by long-time collaborators Akira Miyake, Utada's father Teruzane Utada and themself. "Final Distance" was originally recorded as "Distance" which was taken from the album with the same name, despite not being a single. The song was re-recorded, re-arranged, and dedicated to Rena Yamashita, a six-year-old victim of the Osaka school massacre who had written an essay about being inspired by Utada.

Musically, "Final Distance" incorporates more instrumentation than the previous version, including violins, an acoustic piano and synthesizers. The song strips the original pop music from "Distance" and is a pop ballad song. Despite being written in 2000 from the original version, Utada reflected on the emotions of sorrow, pain, anger and celebration of life while recording the single version.

"Final Distance" received positive reception from most music critics, who praised the re-arrangement and favored this version, although some critics felt the song was inferior to their past ballad tracks. Critics have cited the track as one of Utada's career highlights. Commercially, "Final Distance" stalled at number two on the Oricon Singles Chart, making it their first single to have missed the top spot. The song also resulted in being their lowest selling physical singles at the time but was surpassed by their 2004 single "Dareka no Negai ga Kanau Koro".

An accompanying music video was shot by their then-husband Kazuaki Kiriya, featuring two versions of Utada inside a Utopian-inspired city with ballet dancers and a gothic-like orchestra. The song has been performed on their Utada United 2006 tour and has been featured on a MTV Unplugged appearance in 2002.

Background
During their four-year career since their 1998 debut with their single "Automatic", Utada's status as a Japanese singer and producer was enormous and had benefited with strong sales around Japan. Their first two singles since their debut; "Automatic" and "Movin' On Without You" sold over one million units in Japan, with the first selling over two million. The parent album First Love eventually became the highest selling Japanese album of all time, exceeding sales of more than 7.6 million units in Japan and was certified octuple platinum by the Recording Industry Association of Japan (RIAJ) for shipments of eight million units; the album eventually sold an additional three million worldwide, totaling to 10 million sales. By the end of the year, Utada was rank number 5 on a Japanese radio station Tokio Hot 100 Airplay's Top 100 Artists of the 20th Century by the station and its listeners.

After having a two-year break from the public, their second studio album Distance (2001) became another success and sold over four million units in Japan. The album was backed by the singles "Addicted to You", "Wait & See (Risk)", "For You" / "Time Limit" and "Can You Keep a Secret?", with nearly all the singles achieving over one million sales in Japan. On that album, they recorded "Distance" which contained the same lyrical content as "Final Distance" but the arrangement was handled by Utada and Japanese composer Kei Kawano.

Conception and composition
"Final Distance" was written, co-composed and co-produced by Utada themself, which they have done since their debut. The song was co-composed and co-produced by their father Teruzane Utada and long-time collaborator Akira Miyake. Utada recorded the track at Studio Terra and Bunkamura Studio in Tokyo, Japan. "Final Distance" features several instrument pieces including strings arranged by Saito Neko and played by Great Eida, acoustic piano by Kawano Kei, synthesizers by Tsunemi Kazuhide and other instrument arrangement by Utada. Both "Final Distance" and "Distance" feature the same lyrics but arrangement for the latter track was handled by Kawano Kei. Utada had begun work on their third studio album Deep River in 2001, but Utada discovered a benign ovarian tumor and thus delayed the album to undertake surgery to remove it. They had managed to re-record and finish the track in time.

The conception of re-recording "Final Distance" was due to the Osaka school massacre that took place in early-June 2001. The Osaka school janitor Mamoru Takuma, armed with a kitchen knife, stabbed and killed a total of eight children, with fifteen 
others being injured. Mamoru was diagnosed with severe borderline personality disorder, antisocial personality disorder and paranoid personality disorder; He was later convicted and sentenced to death by hanging on September 14, 2004. One of the murdered schoolgirls, six-year old Rena Yamashita, had written an essay about Utada, talking about how she wanted to become an actress and how Utada inspired her. Yamashita had won an essay competition regarding her essay about Utada. Utada was in the studio while being told by their father about this. While recording the track, they reflected on the emotions of sorrow, pain, anger and celebration and felt that they "found a new meaning" that they will "hold on to the end". They called the re-recorded version "the most beautiful thing I have ever made" and "wish[ed] Rena-chan had heard it too".

Musically, "Final Distance" is a departure from the "bright and warm" pop version of "Distance". "Final Distance" is composed as a low-tempo pop ballad incorporating string assembles and pianos through the entire song. Utada's vocals are layered and sound more "anxious" than the original version. A reviewer from OngakuDB.com commented that it has a "hauntingly solemn atmosphere" and called it "fresh". The single also features a trance remix, a "funny" dance-pop remix, and two instrumentals of both "Distance" and "Final Distance".

Reception

Critical response
"Final Distance" received acclaim from most music critics. David Jeffries, who had written the extended biography of Utada at Allmusic, had selected the song as an album and career standout track. A reviewer from CDJournal had reviewed the original version "Distance" and said the song was a "positive" pop tune, commending the song's production. Another reviewer from CDJournal discussed Utada's first greatest hits compilation Utada Hikaru Single Collection Vol. 1 and commended the track. The reviewer said the song was "beautiful" and "delicate", and felt the production "penetrated" well.

Yonemoto Hiromi from Yeah! J-Pop praised the song's "transformation" into a pop ballad. Despite Himori calling it one of "[Utada's] masterpieces", he did find Utada's new ballad-focused music to be "inferior" to their previous music, citing their 1999 single "First Love" as an example. A reviewer from OngakuDB.com commented that they were "impressed" with the track, commending the "haunting atmosphere" and ballad influence. The reviewer also called it "tremendous".

Commercial response

"Final Distance" debuted at number two on the Oricon Singles Chart. The song was blocked from the number one position which was held by "The Peace!" by Japanese idol girl group Morning Musume. "Final Distance" stayed at number two for four consecutive weeks, while the number one spot was occupied by two songs: "Jidai" by Japanese band Arashi for the second week and "Gold" by B'z for the third and fourth week respectively. The song fell to number six in its fifth week and number ten in its sixth week. In total, the song spent twelve weeks inside the top forty and fell to number forty-nine in final thirteenth week.

"Final Distance" was certified platinum by the Recording Industry Association of Japan (RIAJ) in September 2001 and sold over shipments of 500,000 units in Japan. "Final Distance" resulted in being Utada's lowest selling single in physical sales until this was surpassed by their 2004 single "Dareka no Negai ga Kanau Koro" which only sold over 300,000 units with a double platinum certification. It was not until Utada's 2005 single "Passion" where it became Utada's lowest performing single based on both digital and physical sales, only selling 100,000 physical and digital units respectively.

"Final Distance" became their first single to miss the top spot on the Oricon chart. The song was the only song on their Deep River album to have missed the top spot, with the following singles "Traveling", "Sakura Drops", "Letters" and "Hikari" peaking at number one.

Music video
"Final Distance" was directed by Utada's then-husband Kazuaki Kiriya and was his first directional debut for Utada's singles. Despite this, no DVD edition of the single was released on any format. The video opens with a time-lapse of an ocean. It features Utada singing with two different costumes on in front of yellow back drops. There are inset cuts of a small child and an elderly man dress in dark clothing. It shows Utada in two different settings; a ballet recital with several performers on stage dancing to the track and a dark gothic room with performers dancing to the song, playing the violin and shows Utada sitting down in a school uniform. Through the song, both Utada's are singing the track while dancing and walking around.

After performing in front of an orchestra, both Utada's are in front of a yellow-lit backdrop, looking towards each other and are separated from a glass frame. As they sing, they put their hands against the glass, trying to touch each other. The ending shows both Utada's on a rock in the ocean, in set off a city. As shooting stars come from the sky, both Utada's merge and the scene zooms out in time lapse, similar to the opening scene, and zooms out to show a space-like island with different mechanical structures hovering around it.

Cover versions and live performance 
In November 2014, Universal Music Japan had announced that there would be a tribute album towards Utada's musical works and would be covered by a variety of musicians. During the time off the announcement, however, no specific artists were mentioned and this left public speculation. It was then announced through AramaJapan.com that the artists had been unveiled for the project which included Japanese-American singer Ai; she was revealed to have recorded "Final Distance" for Utada Hikaru no Uta, a tribute album celebrating 15 years since Utada's debut.

A duet version that mixes Utada's vocals recorded in 2001 and Ai's vocals recorded in 2014 was released in Ai's collaboration collection album, The Feat. Best, released on November 2, 2016. This version has a new arrangement, closer to the original song.

It was released as a preceding download from the album on December 3, 2014. This version received favorable reviews from most music critics. Bradley Stern from MuuMuse was particularly positive off the collaboration, stating "For the most part, the featured musicians on Utada Hikaru no Uta stay faithful to the original records while adding their own unique flare to the production [...] like [Ai]‘s soulfully somber take on “Final Distance,”." The song was performed on MTV Unplugged, along with their single "First Love". Utada has played the song only on one of their concert tours, this being the Utada United 2006 tour.

Personnel
Credits adapted from the CD single's liner notes.

Song credits
Hikaru Utada – songwriting, composition, vocal production, production
Teruzane Utada – composition, vocal production, production
Akira Miyake – composition, vocal production, production
Saito Neko – string arrangement
Kawano Kei – keyboards, synthesizer, programming, production (track 4)
Tsumeni Kazuhide – synthesizer
Yokan – horn (track 4)
Great Eida Strings – strings
Recorded by Ugajin Masaaki and Watanabe Syuichi (track 4) at Studio Terra, Tokyo, Japan and Studio Bunkamura, Tokyo, Japan
Mixed by Goh Hotada at Bunkamura, Tokyo, Japan

Cover credits
Kiriya Kazuaki – photographer
Aoki Katsunori – art direction
bff – design
Maeda Eiko – styling
Kanehara Yakayasu – hair and makeup
Kimura Masatomo – design production and distribution

Track listing

Charts and certifications

Weekly charts

Certifications

Notes

References

Hikaru Utada songs
2001 singles
Funerary and memorial compositions
Commemoration songs
Songs used as jingles
Songs written by Hikaru Utada
Pop ballads
EMI Music Japan singles
Charity singles
2001 songs
Ai (singer) songs